Psaeropterella punctifrons is a species of ulidiid or picture-winged fly in the genus Psaeropterella of the family Ulidiidae.

References

Ulidiidae